Košarkaški klub Cedevita Junior, also known as Cedevita Junior, is a men's basketball club based in Zagreb, Croatia. The club is named after its main sponsor Cedevita, and competes in the Croatian HT Premijer liga.

Before its merge to Slovenian team Cedevita Olimpija in 2019, the club won 5 National League championships in 5-in-a-row sequence, seven National Cup titles, two National Supercup title, and one Adriatic Supercup title.

History

Botinec 
The club was established in Zagreb in 1991 as KK Botinec, later becoming KK Hiron Botinec for sponsorship reasons. From season to season, the club moved up from the lowest levels of competition until it reached the A-1 League in 2002. In its first season of elite competition, it took 5th place in Croatia, behind the well-known clubs KK Cibona, KK Zadar, KK Zagreb and KK Split.

New name and bigger ambitions 
A big step was taken in 2005 when Atlantic Grupa, a strong regional company, became the main sponsor of the club, after which the club was renamed to KK Cedevita. The young and modern board of directors raised the ambitions of the club, which achieved great success first in the 09–10 Season when it finished at 3rd place in the Croatian league (in the semi-final playoffs Zadar-Cedevita 2–1), played the semi-finals of the Croatian Cup along with taking 7th place in the strong regional Adriatic League as newcomer. Super Season, with the greatest success in Europe, is 10–11 with  3rd place in EuroCup in very first appearance in the competition of that level. Cedevita played EuroCup Final Four after victorious trip near Dynamo Moscow, Aris, Azovmash, Hemofarm Stada, Gran Canaria and Asefa Estiudiantes in Zagreb and Azovmash, Hapoel Galil Gilboa, Unics, Gran Canaria, Estudiantes and Benetton on the road. After a regular 1st place in the Croatian league, Cedevita won Cibona in semi-final playoffs but lost The Finals against Zagreb CO. Also, Cedevita again took 7th place in Adriatic league. First trophies came in 11–12 season with Cup Dražen Petrović and Croatian National Cup Krešimir Ćosić, also with the finals of the ABA league. First Croatian Champions title Croatian league came in the 13–14 season, also with the second Cup Krešimir Ćosić title and the second finals in the ABA league. Cedevita took two U–18 and one Under-16 Croatian Championships titles.

The first national titles (2011–2013)

But one of the best Season, with the greatest success, is 2011–12, with first-ever Trophies for the team. After winning of the Cup Dražen Petrović (Croatian Supercup) against Zagreb, Cedevita took Croatian Cup Krešimir Ćosić for the first time in history, again against Zagreb in The Finals. After playing in Europe, beating French Champion Elan Chalon in qualifications, Cedevita finished the competition in the group, with strong Spartak St. Petersburg, Benetton Treviso, and Bayern. But the real success was 2nd  place in the regular season of Adriatic league and crown came with great Finals in Tel Aviv, victory against Partizan in semi-finals and lose against Maccabi Tel Aviv in the finals. With that result, Cedevita had Euroleague place in her pocket. After 2nd place in the Croatian league, Cedevita won Split in semi-final playoffs but lost The Finals against Cibona.

Since 2005, the club has been led by great coaches such as the former coach of the Croatian National Team Srećko Medvedec, former Olympic Silver Medalist from Seoul and best scorer of the Euroleague Zdravko Radulović, former Yugoslavian National Team player Slobodan Subotić, former coach of Olympiacos and Panathinaikos and Aleksandar Petrović, National Team player and later Croatian National Team coach (brother of the famous Dražen Petrović) who became the best Eurocup coach in the 2010–11 season. Today, sitting on Cedevita's bench is current National Team of Croatia coach Jasmin Repeša who came in 13–14 season and will lead the team in 14–15 season.

Before Repeša coach was in 2012–13 four-time European Champion with Jugoplastika Split, Limoges and Panathinaikos, great Božidar Maljković, the successor of the former Croatian champion with Cibona and Belgian champion with Charleroi, Dražen Anzulović, who led Cedevita in season, 2011–12. Over the past few years, former Croatian and Bosnian National team members played for the team, including Slaven Rimac, Jurica Žuža, Damir Milačić, Krešimir Novosel, Mate Miliša, Milan Parezanović, Pero Dujmović, Stipe Modrić, Frano Čolak, alongside several excellent American players such as A. J. Guyton, Marlon Garnett, Adam Harrington, God Shammgod, Vonteego Cummings or Ramel Bradley.

The 2009–10 roster was strong with former Croatian National Team players Andrija Žižić, team captain Marino Baždarić and Damjan Rudež, B National Team player Tomislav Petrović, Bosnia and Herzegovina National Team players Bariša Krasić and Ivan Opačak, Canadian National Team playmaker Jermaine Anderson and Americans Ricardo Marsh and Thomas Mobley, as well as the Under-20 Croatian National Team player Dino Butorac. In younger selections cadets became Champions of Croatia.

The 2010–11 roster was especially strong with Žižić, Baždarić, Rudež, Petrović, Butorac, and newcomers as former Croatian National Team players Vedran Vukušić and Vladimir Krstić, ex Cibona player Robert Troha and ex BIH National Team player Vedran Princ. EuroCup MVP was American Dontaye Draper, new Croatian National Team member, EuroCup second team member Bracey Wright and center Corsley Edwards. In younger selections, juniors and cadets became vice Champions of Croatia.

Cedevita started 11–12 season's roster was especially strong with the best foreign player ever in Croatia, three times European Champion with CSKA and Bologna, Slovenian National Team player Matjaž Smodiš, fine Americans Chris Owens and Chris Warren, ex NBA and National Team player Dalibor Bagarić, new NT players Miro Bilan and Marko Car, along with Draper, Baždarić, Princ, Vukušić, Petrović, Opačak. In younger selections, juniors became Champions and cadets vice Champions of Croatia.

The 2012–13 season was marked by the arrival of the four times European Champion, coach Božidar Maljković for the first time ever participation of the club in the EuroLeague. Three Croatian National Team members, Marko Tomas, Lukša Andrić and Luka Babić joined the club, as well as stars like Mickaël Gelabale or Vlado Ilievski. Cedevita achieved its first victories at the highest level in Europe, but without passing to the TOP 16. After Maljković left the club, Aleksandar Petrović became the new coach but he also left the club before the end of the season in the Adriatic League in which Cedevita won the 6th place, enough for the participation in the EuroCup's next season. Before leaving, coach Petrović played the Cup finals, and interim coach Jakša Vulić reach the semifinals of the Croatian A-1 League play off. In younger selections juniors became vice Champions of Croatia and cadets, young cadets and Under-12 team played in Final fours.

Five Croatian League titles (2013–2019)

The 2013–14 season started with big change on the bench, with the arrival of Jasmin Repeša, Croatian National Team coach who led Croatia to the semifinals of European Championships in Slovenia. Repeša had young but strong defense roster with one of the best young players in Europe, 19-year-old Jusuf Nurkić and 16-year-old Lovro Mazalin. With Bilan, Suton, Tomas, captain Baždarić and Babić from season before, team roster was stronger for occasional NT players Ante Delaš, Tomislav Zubčić and Ivan Ramljak and two strong Americans Nolan Smith and Allan Ray. BC Cedevita has won Cup Krešimir Ćosić, against BC Zagreb in the finals 86:68. In EuroCup passed by Elan Chalon, Charleroi and Oldenburg in the second stage, with Bilbao and Dynamo Sassari from a group, and stayed in Top 32 level regardless victories in Zaragoza or Istanbul over Bešiktaš. The club lost two games against Lietuvos Rytas, 83:84 and 75:74. But the best came latter. In great Final four tournament of ABA league in Belgrade, Cedevita defeat Partizan in front of 15,000 home supporters but lost in the finals from Cibona. This final is important because it ensured EuroLeague ticket for 14–15 season. The best came at the end of the season, with the first Croatian Champions title and great 3–0 victory in the series against Cibona. In 13–14 season Cedevita has won the new title in junior competition and became U–18 Croatian Champions.

In the 2014–15 season Cedevita became Croatian Champion again, with a win 3–1 in the playoffs finals vs Cibona, won Croatian Krešimir Ćosić Cup again and with an ABA league Finals (1–3 against Crvena Zvezda) will play in EuroLeague 15–16. Under-16 team is Croatian Champion, Under-18 team played in the Finals. Džanan Musa is MVP Under-16 European Championship with gold for Bosnia and Herzegovina, Marko Arapović is a captain silver Under-19 Croatian Team at World Under-19 Cup with a position in best 5 of the tournament.

The new 2015–16 season with a new coach, Veljko Mršić and Gianmarco Pozzecco as assistant coach brings in some of the best seasons ever in 2015–16. Championships title again also Croatian Krešimir Ćosić Cup with semifinals in ABA league and Top 16 EuroLeague. In the 2016–17 again 4th-time champions with 5th time Croatian Cup, finals of Adriatic ABA League with Top 16 EuroCup. Miro Bilan, Marko Arapović, Filip Krušlin and Luka Babić played at the Olympic Games in Rio and Džanan Musa became the best scorer of FIBA Under-17 World Cup with Bosnia and Herzegovina National Team. In 2017–18 season the club started with legend player on coach position Jure Zdovc and assistant Slaven Rimac on the bench and first trophy, first ever ABA League Supercup in Bar. This season is a record in Croatia because Cedevita was first in Croatian League (5-th in a row) 2017–18 A-1 League as the senior team, also U-19, U-17 and U-11 team and U-15 vice champions. It was time for a 6-th Croatian Cup Krešimir Ćosić Cup. After TOP-16 in Eurocup Cedevita reaches semifinals of 2017–18 ABA League. Džanan Musa was EuroCup Basketball Rising Star 2017–18 EuroCup Basketball and ABA League Top Prospect 2017–18 ABA League First Division. In 2018-2019 season first coach will be Sito Alonso. The season was one of the worst in club history - poor results in the ABA League and the EuroCup lead to Alonso's firing and the hiring of former player Slaven Rimac. While the results improved, Cedevita was eliminated in the Top16 of the EuroCup, and the semifinals of the ABA League. Cedevita won Krešimir Ćosić Cup, but suffered a complete fiasco in the 2018–19 A-1 League, barely qualifying to the finals and getting swept by KK Cibona.

Merge with Olimpija Ljubljana

On June 4, 2019, it was announced that Cedevita is about to merge with Slovenian team Olimpija Ljubljana and form Cedevita Olimpija. Some departments of the club, such as the Youth Academy, are planned to stay in Zagreb and continue as KK Cedevita Junior. In June 2019, Cedevita had applied for a change of headquarters from Zagreb to Ljubljana, Slovenia. Upon the decision of resettlement, and followed by the confirmation of both assemblies, Cedevita Zagreb and Olimpija Ljubljana made the association of clubs. KK Cedevita Olimpija was established at the meeting on July 8 in Arena Stožice.

The club was a founding member of the Adriatic Basketball Association in 2015. In December 2020, the club's shares were transferred to Cedevita Olimpija.

Cedevita Junior years (2019–present) 
Cedevita Junior was established as a new legal entity on May 31, 2019, and registered on June 11 by a local government authority. On June 18, the Croatian Basketball Federation issued a statement where they declined participation of the club in the 2019–20 Croatian League season. In July 2019, Marino Baždarić was named a sports director. The club was initially set to play in the bottom division of croatian basketball league by Croatian Basketball Federation, because it was considered as newly formed club. However, after merging with KK Agrodalm and taking its licence, Cedevita Junior began to compete in Prva liga (the second division of croatian basketball league).

Home arenas 

Since the summer of 2019, the club has been playing their home games at the Cedevita Basketball Dome, which is located in the Zagreb Fair in Zagreb.

Honours

KK Cedevita 
Total titles: 18

Identity
After the company Cedevita changed its brand colors from red to orange in 2015, the basketball club also re-branded and adopted orange as its main color for the 2016–17 season.

Players

Current roster

Retired numbers

Season-by-season

Cedevita (2009–2019)

Head coaches

Botinec (1991–2005)
 1991–1993:  Tomislav Mlinar
 1993–1994:  Roland Janković
 1994–1998:  Antonio Ozmec
 1998–2003:  Jakša Vulić
 2003–2004:  Dejan Jovović; Jakša Vulić
 2004–2005:  Jakša Vulić
Cedevita (2005–2019)
 2005–2006:  Srećko Medvedec; Rudolf Jugo
 2006–2007:  Jakša Vulić
 2007–2008:  Jakša Vulić; Zdravko Radulović
 2008–2009:  Zdravko Radulović; Ivan Meheš ; Zoran Kalpić ; Srećko Medvedec
 2009–2010:  Slobodan Subotić;  Aleksandar Petrović  
 2010–2011:  Aleksandar Petrović; Ivan Rudež  
 2011–2012:  Dražen Anzulović
 2012–2013:  Božidar Maljković;  Jakša Vulić ; Aleksandar Petrović ; Jakša Vulić
 2013–2015:  Jasmin Repeša; Veljko Mršić  
 2015–2017:  Veljko Mršić;  Gianmarco Pozzecco  
 2017–2018:  Jure Zdovc
 2018–2019:  Sito Alonso;  Slaven Rimac

Cedevita Junior (2019–present)
 2019–2021:  Marko Trninić
 2021–2022:  Damir Mulaomerović

Management

Presidents
  Mladen Veber (2008–2018)
  Emil Tedeschi (2018–2019)
  Neven Vranković (2019–2020)

General managers / Directors
  Krešimir Novosel (2007–2015)
  Davor Užbinec (2015–2019)
  Tomislav Zebić (2019–present)

Sports directors 
  Matej Mamić (2008–2018)
  Veljko Mršić (2018–2019)
  Marino Baždarić (2019–present)

Team managers 
  Mate Skelin (2009–2017)
  Matko Jovanović (2017–2019)
  Zdravko Vučković (2020–2021)

Notable players

  Ryan Boatright
  Marlon Garnett
  Nemanja Gordić
  Bariša Krasić
  Ante Mašić
  Džanan Musa
  Jusuf Nurkić
  Ivan Opačak
  Andrija Stipanović
  Vítor Benite
  Augusto Lima
  Jermaine Anderson
  Lukša Andrić
  Marko Arapović
  Luka Babić
  Dalibor Bagarić
  Marko Banić
  Stanko Barać
  Marino Baždarić
  Miro Bilan
  Ivan Buva
  Marko Car
  Ante Delaš
  Mario Delaš
  Dontaye Draper
  Duje Dukan
  Vladimir Krstić
  Filip Krušlin
  Fran Pilepić
  Ivan Ramljak
  Slaven Rimac
  Damjan Rudež
  Marko Tomas
  Roko Ukić
  Tomislav Zubčić
  Andrija Žižić
  Mickaël Gelabale
  Jacob Pullen
  Marques Green
  Vlado Ilievski
  Mirza Begić
  Edo Murić
  Matjaž Smodiš
  Pablo Aguilar
  Chris Warren
  Will Cherry
  Vonteego Cummings
  Corsley Edwards
  A. J. Guyton
  Adam Harrington
  Pierre Jackson
  Josh Magette
  Kevin Murphy
  Demetris Nichols
  Josh Selby
  Chris Owens
  Allan Ray
  God Shammgod
  Nolan Smith
  Henry Walker
  James White
  Bracey Wright

See also

KK Cedevita in European competitions

References

External links
 
 KK Cedevita at Eurobasket.com

Cedevita
Cedevita
Cedevita Junior
Sports teams in Zagreb
1991 establishments in Croatia
2019 establishments in Croatia